Neighbourhell is the sixth album by Italian metal band Eldritch. It was released in 2006 and in the limited version contained the video clip for "Save me".

Track listing

References 
[ Neighbourhell overview] at Allmusic

2006 albums
Eldritch (band) albums
Limb Music albums